Muscliff and Strouden Park is a ward in Bournemouth, Dorset. Since 2019, the ward has elected 3 councillors to Bournemouth, Christchurch and Poole Council.

Geography 
The ward is located in the north eastern suburbs of Bournemouth, including some rural green belt areas of the South East Dorset conurbation. The ward takes its name from the areas of Muscliff and Strouden Park. Other areas in the ward include Holdenhurst, Townsend and Throop. The largest employer in the ward is the Castlepoint Shopping Centre.

Election results

References 

Wards of Bournemouth, Christchurch and Poole